Hamlet Goes Business is a 1987 Finnish comedy film directed by Aki Kaurismäki and starring Pirkka-Pekka Petelius. It is based on William Shakespeare's play Hamlet, but the events are housed in a modern Finnish wood processing family business.

Plot
After the death of his father, Hamlet inherits a seat on the company board controlled by his uncle that decides to enter the rubber duck market. Hamlet is suspicious of the circumstances surrounding his father's death.

Cast

See also
 Hamlet on screen

References

External links
 
 
 
 
 
 
 

1987 films
1987 comedy films
1980s business films
1980s Finnish-language films
Finnish black-and-white films
Finnish comedy films
Films directed by Aki Kaurismäki
Films based on Hamlet
Modern adaptations of works by William Shakespeare
Finnish films based on plays